Ameritz may refer to:
Ameritz Karaoke, had a chart hit with a cover of the Leona Lewis version of the Snow Patrol song Run
Ameritz Studios, Birkenhead-based recording studio